Valley Road Estate was a public housing estate in Valley Road, Lo Lung Hang, Kowloon, Hong Kong. It was originally a squatter area, but was destroyed by fire in 1961. In 1962, the British Hong Kong Government constructed a total of 16 blocks (Block 1 to 12, Block 14 to 17), namely the Valley Road Government Low Cost Housing Estate, on the site. In 1973, the estate was renamed Valley Road Estate. It was demolished in 2001 and 2002.

The Ho Man Tin station of the MTR, an interchange station between the Kwun Tong line and Sha Tin to Central Link, was built on part of the vacant site of the former estate. In June 2010, another part of the site was sold to Sun Hung Kai Properties for HK$10.9 billion through land auction. Its auction price was the second highest in Hong Kong property history.

See also 

 Public housing in Hong Kong

References

Lo Lung Hang
Former public housing estates in Hong Kong
Residential buildings completed in 1962
2002 disestablishments in Hong Kong
Demolished buildings and structures in Hong Kong
Buildings and structures demolished in 2002